Ana Torrent Bertrán de Lis (born 12 July 1966) is a Spanish film actress.

Early life and career 
Her debut came in 1973 with the starring role as "Ana" in the film El espíritu de la colmena (The Spirit of the Beehive), directed by Víctor Erice, when she was seven years old. This was followed by another memorable role in which she played another character with the same name in Cría Cuervos (Raise Ravens) (1976) by director Carlos Saura.

In 1989, Torrent performed with Sharon Stone in the film Blood and Sand directed by Javier Elorrieta. In 1996, Torrent received numerous awards and nominations, including a Goya Award nomination for her lead actress role in Alejandro Amenábar's film Tesis (Thesis). By the end of the 1990s, she received critical acclaim when she played a Basque nationalist murdered for quitting ETA, in the film Yoyes (1999) directed by Helena Taberna. In 2008, Torrent portrayed Catherine of Aragon in the film The Other Boleyn Girl (2008), starring alongside Natalie Portman and Scarlett Johansson.

Filmography

Accolades
Fotogramas de Plata 
1974  Won Fotogramas de Plata Award Best Spanish Movie Performer
Goya Awards
1997  Nominated Goya Best Lead Actress (Mejor Actriz Principal) for: Tesis (1996)
Gramado Film Festival 
1996  Won Golden Kikito Award Latin Competition: Best Actress for: Tesis (1996)
Montréal World Film Festival 
1980  Won Best Actress for: El Nido (1980)
Premios ACE 
2004  Nominated Best Actress for: Una preciosa puesta de sol (2003)
1997  Won Best Actress for: Tesis (1996)
Toulouse Cinespaña
2000  Won Best Actress for: Yoyes (2000)

References

External links

Ana's memories of the shooting of The Spirit of the Beehive (in Spanish)
Photo of Ana Torrent at Flickr.

1966 births
Living people
Actresses from Madrid
Spanish television actresses
Spanish film actresses